Richard Ellis represented Dedham, Massachusetts in the Great and General Court from 1825 to 1831 and in 1833. He also served for 29 nonconsecutive years as town clerk in Dedham, beginning in 1815.

References

Works cited

Members of the Massachusetts General Court
Year of birth missing
Year of death missing
Dedham Town Clerks